The 1962 Kent State Golden Flashes football team was an American football team that represented Kent State University in the Mid-American Conference (MAC) during the 1962 NCAA University Division football season. In their 17th season under head coach Trevor J. Rees, the Golden Flashes compiled a 3–6 record (2–4 against MAC opponents), finished in fifth place in the MAC, and were outscored by all opponents by a combined total of 185 to 107.

The team's statistical leaders included Dick Merschman with 555 rushing yards, Jim Flynn with 605 passing yards, and Dick Wolf with 119 receiving yards. Running back Dick Merschman was selected as a first-team All-MAC player.

Schedule

References

Kent State
Kent State Golden Flashes football seasons
Kent State Golden Flashes football